Ichapore or Ichhapur is a locality in North Barrackpur Municipality of North 24 Parganas district in the Indian state of West Bengal. It is a part of the area covered by Kolkata Metropolitan Development Authority (KMDA). Ichhapur Defence Estate has two ordnance factories, the Rifle Factory Ishapore (RFI) and the Metal and Steel Factory (MSF) of the Ordnance Factories Board.

Geography

Location

96% of the population of Barrackpore subdivision (partly presented in the map alongside) live in urban areas. In 2011, it had a density of population of 10,967 per km2 The subdivision has 16 municipalities and 24 census towns.

For most of the cities/ towns information regarding density of population is available in the Infobox. Population data is not available for neighbourhoods. It is available for the entire municipal area and thereafter ward-wise.

All places marked on the map are linked in the full-screen map.

Ichapore is not identified in 2011 census as a separate location and may have been included in some other location. In the Map of Barrackpore I CD Block on page 365 of District Census Handbook, Ichapore railway station and the entire area around Ichhapur Defence Estate is included in North Barrackpur municipality.

Post Office
Ichapur has a non-delivery sub post office, with PIN 743144 in the North Presidency Division of North 24 Parganas district in Calcutta region. Other post offices with the same PIN are the Metal and Steel Factory, Anandamath, Ichapur Nawabganj, PS Bureau, Ichapur Rifle Factory and Kantadhar.

References

External links

Cities and towns in North 24 Parganas district
Neighbourhoods in North 24 Parganas district
Former Austrian colonies
Neighbourhoods in Kolkata
Kolkata Metropolitan Area